AL4 may refer to:

 AL4, a postcode district in the AL postcode area
 British Rail Class 84
 Fault Tolerance - Nonstop Computing - High Availability Computing - AL4